Saúl Craviotto Rivero (born 3 November 1984) is a Spanish sprint kayaker who has been racing since the mid-2000s. He has won five Olympic medals: a gold medal (with Carlos Pérez) in the K-2 500 m at the 2008 Summer Olympics in Beijing, a silver medal in the K-1 200 m event at the 2012 Summer Olympics in London, a gold medal (with Cristian Toro) in the K-2 200 m and a bronze medal in the K-1 200 m at the 2016 Summer Olympics in Rio de Janeiro, and a silver medal (with Marcus Walz, Carlos Arévalo and Rodrigo Germade) in the K-4 500 m at the 2020 Summer Olympics in Tokyo. He served as the flag bearer for Spain at the closing ceremony of the 2012 Olympics and at the opening ceremony of the 2020 Olympics.

Craviotto also won seven medals at the ICF Canoe Sprint World Championships with three golds (K-1 : 2009, 2010, 2011), two silvers (K-2 200 m: 2009, 2010) and two bronzes (K-1 200m: 2013, 2014).

Craviotto took up kayaking at the age of seven, following his father, and competed together with him in K-2 events. He is married to Celia García and has a daughter Valentina. He proposed to his wife at the 2012 Olympics, at Piccadilly Circus, the day after winning an Olympic silver medal. He works as a police officer in Gijón.

In 2017, Craviotto participated in the reality television cooking show MasterChef Celebrity and won.

In 2021, Craviotto became Hockerty's first brand's ambassador and model.

TV career

References

External links

1984 births
Living people
Spanish people of Italian descent
Spanish male canoeists
Olympic canoeists of Spain
Canoeists at the 2008 Summer Olympics
Canoeists at the 2012 Summer Olympics
Canoeists at the 2016 Summer Olympics
Canoeists at the 2020 Summer Olympics
Olympic gold medalists for Spain
Olympic silver medalists for Spain
Olympic bronze medalists for Spain
Olympic medalists in canoeing
Medalists at the 2008 Summer Olympics
Medalists at the 2012 Summer Olympics
Medalists at the 2016 Summer Olympics
Medalists at the 2020 Summer Olympics
ICF Canoe Sprint World Championships medalists in kayak
European Games competitors for Spain
Canoeists at the 2015 European Games
Sportspeople from Lleida
Mediterranean Games gold medalists for Spain
Mediterranean Games bronze medalists for Spain
Mediterranean Games medalists in canoeing
Competitors at the 2013 Mediterranean Games
Canoeists at the 2019 European Games